Cornelius Donahue alias "Lame Johnny" (c.1850 in Philadelphia – 1878), was an American cattle rustler, horse thief and outlaw from the Black Hills of South Dakota. His gang's most notorious robbery was probably $3,500 in currency, $500 in diamonds, hundreds of dollars' worth of jewelry and 700 pounds of gold dust, nuggets and bullion from a special treasure coach called the "Monitor" belonging to the Homestake Mine in October 1878.

Doug Engebretson in his book Empty saddles, forgotten names: Outlaws of the Black Hills and Wyoming has the following to say on Johnny's demise:

In July 1879 the coach going from Cheyenne, Wyoming to Deadwood, South Dakota carried captured stage robber Lame Johnny who was being returned to Deadwood for trial. Near Buffalo Gap, Dakota Territory, Lame Johnny became "restless and nervous." He revealed his fear of Daniel Boone May, who was seen riding parallel to the coach. May and messenger Jesse Brown left the stage at Buffalo Gap and "Whispering" Smith, retained responsibility for Lame Johnny. Shortly thereafter, the coach was stopped, and eight vigilantes hanged Lame Johnny.

His headstone, which is now missing, once read:

Pilgrim Pause!
You’re standing on
The molding clay of Limping John.
Tread lightly, stranger, on this sod.
For if he moves, you’re robbed, by God''

Donahue was never officially identified as part of the gang that robbed the Monitor at Canyon Creek Station on September 26, 1878. Some historians attribute that particular gang's leadership to Charles Carey, who was subsequently hanged at the Jenny Stockade. Vigilantes went on an outlaw hunting spree following the ambush and robbery of the Monitor at Canyon Springs Station. Lame Johnny was later apprehended and hung in June 1879 by a group of vigilantes that quite likely included Daniel Boone May, who was a stage coach "messenger" (hired guard,) gunman, and part-time lawman in the Black Hills area. May was an outrider on the coach carrying Lame Johnny to Custer City for trial. According to the stage driver and accompanying lawman Whispering Smith, May mysteriously disappeared just before the stage was stopped at gunpoint by a lone masked men. Lame Johnny was dragged from the coach, and the stage was sent on its way. According to some sources, Lame Johnny was threatened with hanging by the vigilantes if he didn't tell them the location of his ill-gotten treasure.

References

External links 

Lame Johnny's Lost Treasure

Outlaws of the American Old West
1850s births
1878 deaths
Criminals from Philadelphia